The 5th Air Force Division was a division of the Bundeswehr's German Air Force. It was located from 1963 to 1971 in Birkenfeld and from 1990 to 1994 in Strausberg (Eggersdorf). It was the successor of the Kommando LSK/LV.

Overview
The 5th Air Division was formed in April 1963, after the creation in Trier of Fliegerführer Süd in 1959, which became Fliegerdivision Süd (Air Division South) in Karlsruhe in 1961. The division headquarters was located in Birkenfeld; up to the time of the first division were also assigned to ground-based air defense forces. From 1971 the division's units fell under the command of the 2nd Air Division.

The division was reformed after German reunification. On 3 October 1990 the existence of the National People's Army (NVA) ended. A preparation staff for the 5th Air Division was created on 3 October 1990 at Eggersdorf / Strausberg, headed by major general Bernhard Mende.

At that time some of the former NVA establishments existed with the existing personnel structures, including the LSK/LV command continued. The command over the forces of the former LSK/LV, however, was from 3 October 1990 with the leadership of the armed forces. This transitional period ended on 1 April 1991 with the creation of the 5th Air Division. In 1994 the 5th Air Division was disbanded and its units transferred to the 3rd Air Division, which was itself disbanded in 2006.

Commanders from 1990 to 1994
The commanders of the 5th Air Force from 1990 to 1994 were:

Commanders from 1963 to 1971
The commanders of the 5. Luftwaffendivision from 1963 to 1971 were:

Units of the 5th Air Force 
Radarführungskommando 3, Fürstenwalde
Jagdgeschwader 73, Rostock-Laage Airport
FlakRak Geschwaders 51 and 52
LTG 65, Neuhardenberg
Nachrichtenregiment 14, Waldsieversdorf

References

External links 
 
 Private website with information on this unit

Units and formations of the German Air Force
Military units and formations of the Cold War
Divisions of the Bundeswehr
Military units and formations established in 1963
Military units and formations disestablished in 1971
Military units and formations established in 1990
Military units and formations disestablished in 1994